Association Sportive Kunié is a football club of New Caledonia, competing in the New Caledonia Super Ligue. Its colors are red and white.

Stadium

The current the club stadium is the Stade Numa Daly, in the city of Nouméa, with a capacity for 9,646 spectators.

Titles

The team was champion of the two edition of New Caledonia Super Ligue: 1985 and 1992.

Players

Manager:  Kenjy Vendegou

References

Football clubs in New Caledonia